The 1947 Omloop Het Volk was the third edition of the Omloop Het Volk cycle race and was held on 23 March 1947. The race started and finished in Ghent. The race was won by Albert Sercu.

General classification

References

1947
Omloop Het Nieuwsblad
Omloop Het Nieuwsblad